Tamala is an urban locality (an urban-type settlement) in Tamalinsky District of Penza Oblast, Russia. Population:

References

Urban-type settlements in Penza Oblast